Ebbe Vestermann Parsner (6 June 1922 – 24 October 2013) was a Danish rower who specialized in the double scull event. Together with Aage Larsen he won the European titles in 1949 and 1950 and a silver medal at the 1948 Olympics. At the 1952 Games they were eliminated in the first round.

During World War II Parsner served in the navy. After retiring from competitions he worked as a sales manager for General Motors and BP. Parsner was married and had two daughters. His wife died in 2008.

References

1922 births
2013 deaths
Danish male rowers
Olympic rowers of Denmark
Rowers at the 1948 Summer Olympics
Rowers at the 1952 Summer Olympics
Olympic silver medalists for Denmark
Olympic medalists in rowing
Medalists at the 1948 Summer Olympics
European Rowing Championships medalists
Rowers from Copenhagen